A treenail, also trenail, trennel, or trunnel, is a wooden peg, pin, or dowel used to fasten pieces of wood together, especially in timber frames, covered bridges, wooden shipbuilding and boat building.  It is driven into a hole bored through two (or more) pieces of structural wood (mortise and tenon).

History and general use

The use of wood as a tenon can be traced back over 7,000 years, as archaeologist have found traces of wood nails in the excavation of early Germanic sites. Trenails are extremely economical and readily available, making them a common early building material. Black Locust is a favorite wood when making trunnels in shipbuilding in North America  and English Oak in Europe due to their strength and rot resistance, while red oak is typical in buildings. Traditionally treenails and pegs were made by splitting bolts of wood with a froe and shaping them with a drawknife on a shaving horse. Treenails are cut from a single piece of wood and perform well because of the natural grain. The grain of the treenail runs perpendicular to the grain of the receiving mortises which adds structural strength. Treenails are typically  in diameter and are hand whittled with rough facets. The mortise is drilled  smaller than the treenail to create a tight fit and take advantage of friction in the mortise. In the same case the mortise is drilled in two parts, with a smaller auger for the smaller part of the treenail and a typical auger for the standard part. Other trenails are tapered with the large end being  longer than the mortise. After treenails are hammered into the mortise, they can be trimmed, split, and wedged with a small piece of oak that increases friction force. As an alternative to the wedge, the treenail can receive a plug or a punch to the center that expands the entire circumference. While this method prevents leaks by reducing gaps, plugs and punches are more likely to fall out in cold temperatures. Ideally, the nose of the treenail is driven 4–5 cm clear of the timber before being trimmed. Unlike metal nails, trenails can not be removed (without great effort) or reused. As the wood shrinks or expand the fibers create a friction that interlocks it into the mortise snugly. If a treenail breaks or fails but the wood it is fastening remains intact the remaining trenail can be cut out and replaced with a larger treenail that fits snugly. In addition, treenails have the ability to move over time and retain structural integrity.

Uses in building structures 

Early mortise and tenon trusses with spans of less than  used treenail fasteners. When used in a truss, the connecting mortises are drilled off center such that when the treenail is inserted it creates a tighter joint. Because of the large number of trenails required in a truss, the treenails can be turned on a lathe with a head and a tapered end, often kept extra-long for the tightest fit. The bottom chord often requires 2–3 pegs and is the weakest part of the truss. In cases where significant shrinkage may occur, it may be necessary to use iron U-straps or reinforcements.

Uses in ships 

Ancient shipbuilding used treenails to bind the boat together. They had the advantage of not giving rise to "nail-sickness", a term for decay accelerated and concentrated around metal fasteners. Increased water content causes wood to expand, so that treenails gripped the planks tighter as they absorbed water. However, when the treenail was a different wood species from the planking, it usually caused rot. Treenails and iron nails were most common until the 1780s when copper nails over copper sheathing became more popular. As late as the 1870s, the merchant navy ships used treenails and iron bolts, while the higher class ships used the copper and yellow metal bolts and dumps. In the 1870s tradition, treenails were typically used in a ratio of four treenails to one bolt with the exception that sometimes the number of bolts was increased. In later corvettes, the ratio was changed to two treenails to one bolt.

Uses in railroads 
Similar wooden trenail fastenings were used as alternatives to metal spikes to secure railroad rail-support "chairs" to wooden sleepers (ties) in early Victorian times. Treenails were extensively used constructing railroads in North England.

References

Woodworking
Shipbuilding
Timber framing